Rupper Kalan is a village situated in Rawalpindi Tehsil near Chak Beli Khan in Rawalpindi District, Punjab, Pakistan.

Its population is roughly 1,400 persons, and its registered voters is almost 800 in the pages of Election Commission of Pakistan according to the Election of 2008. The village consists of very limited land area. Most land occupied by its population is purchased from neighboring villages. 

In the east its boundary touches Katari village, in the southeast it links to Dhok shah Alam, and in the west a village Raja Nara is situated. In the west it also encroaches into jungle and mountains. Rupper has some basic amenities like electricity, roads, cement streets, a post office, and primary schools. However the village is missing basic health units, female health workers, a Girls High School, a Boys High School, etc.

There is no well-equipped market in Rupper. Some of the villagers are employed in public sectors and in law enforcement agencies like the army and most of them are working abroad. The major crops are wheat, maize, peanuts, barley, etc. However, the area is arid and agricultural production depends on the weather. A limited number of the population work in agriculture. All agriculture is based on conventional system. Almost all of the population belongs to Sunni creed of Islam.

Populated places in Rawalpindi District